Little River is a census-designated place (CDP) in Horry County, South Carolina, United States. The population was 11,711 at the 2020 census.

Little River is named for the Little River, which flows into the Atlantic Ocean at the state line between North Carolina and South Carolina. The Little River inlet has long been a breakpoint for tropical cyclone warnings.

Geography
Little River is located at  (33.871629, -78.627733).

According to the United States Census Bureau, the CDP has a total area of 10.8 square miles (28.0 km2), of which 10.5 square miles (27.1 km2) is land and 0.4 square mile (0.9 km2) (3.33%) is water.
The area is mainly made up of housing developments, old scrub pine forests, marshes and swamps and is bordered by the Waccamaw River and the Atlantic Intracoastal waterway. Live oaks, Spanish moss and palm trees dot the landscape.

Demographics

2020 census

As of the 2020 United States census, there were 11,711 people, 4,885 households, and 2,633 families residing in the CDP.

2000 census
As of the census of 2000, there were 7,027 people, 3,287 households, and 2,225 families residing in the CDP. The population density was 671.9 people per square mile (259.4/km2). There were 4,715 housing units at an average density of 450.8/sq mi (174.0/km2). The racial makeup of the CDP was 91.40% White, 6.80% African American, 0.43% Native American, 0.28% Asian, 0.04% Pacific Islander, 0.34% from other races, and 0.70% from two or more races. Hispanic or Latino, of any race, were 1.02% of the population.

There were 3,287 households, out of which 18.6% had children under the age of 18 living with them, 57.0% were married couples living together, 8.4% had a female householder with no husband present, and 32.3% were non-families. 26.0% of all households were made up of individuals, and 10.5% had someone living alone who was 65 years of age or older. The average household size was 2.14 and the average family size was 2.53.

In the CDP, the population was spread out, with 15.7% under the age of 18, 4.7% from 18 to 24, 24.2% from 25 to 44, 31.9% from 45 to 64, and 23.4% who were 65 years of age or older. The median age was 49 years. For every 100 females, there were 92.7 males. For every 100 females age 18 and over, there were 91.8 males.

The median income for a household in the CDP was $40,427, and the median income for a family was $45,243. Males had a median income of $36,086 versus $22,348 for females. The per capita income for the CDP was $22,733. About 4.7% of families and 7.5% of the population were below the poverty line, including 15.3% of those under age 18 and 1.7% of those age 65 or over.

Arts and culture
The community is host to an annual Blue Crab Festival each May.

During the 21 years that South Carolina had legalized video poker, Little River's location near the North Carolina state line made the community a major center for the activity. In 1996, local churches began protesting legalized gambling in what had become Little Reno, and the state outlawed the games in 2000. Two years before the video poker ban, casino boats began operating and continue to do so in federal waters because the state has not specifically banned them. Little River has the state's only two casino boats, the SunCruz Aquasino and The Big M Casino.

Major highways
  US 17
  SC 9
  SC 90
  SC 179

Education
Little River has a public library, a branch of the Horry County Memorial Library.

References

External links

  Little River Chamber of Commerce
  Little River

Census-designated places in Horry County, South Carolina
Census-designated places in South Carolina
Populated coastal places in South Carolina